José Pablo Fonseca Díaz (born November 25, 1973) is a retired Costa Rican footballer.

Club career
Fonseca had played almost his entire career for Saprissa, where he debuted at the young age of 18 years. He was also played for other Costa Rican teams such as A.D. Belén, Municipal Liberia and C.S. Cartaginés, only to return to Saprissa three years ago when asked by coach Hernan Medford.

With Saprissa, Fonseca won five national championships and three CONCACAF Champions' Cup. He was also part of the squad that played the 2005 FIFA Club World Championship Toyota Cup, where Saprissa finished third behind São Paulo and Liverpool. That makes him one of the most title-winning soccer players in Costa Rica's and Saprissa's history.

He retired in June 2010 when at Ramonense.

International career
Fonseca made his debut for Costa Rica in a November 1996 friendly match against Panama and has earned a total of 4 caps, scoring 0 goals. He has represented his country in 1 FIFA World Cup qualification match 

His final international was an August 2000 friendly match against Venezuela.

References

External links
 

1973 births
Living people
Association football defenders
Costa Rican footballers
Costa Rica international footballers
Deportivo Saprissa players
Belén F.C. players
Municipal Liberia footballers
C.S. Cartaginés players
C.F. Universidad de Costa Rica footballers
Liga FPD players
Central American and Caribbean Games gold medalists for Costa Rica
Competitors at the 1993 Central American and Caribbean Games
Central American and Caribbean Games medalists in football